Margarita is a feminine given name in Latin and Eastern European languages. In Latin it came from the Greek word margaritari (μαργαριτάρι), meaning pearl, which was borrowed from the Persians. (In Sogdian, it was marγārt. In modern Persian, the word has become مروارید, morvārīd, meaning 'pearl'.)

The flower daisy is called margarita in Spanish, Greek and other languages. In Italian it's margherita and in French is marguerite. The name is also used in Albanian, Greek, Bulgarian and Russian. Margarita is a variant of the likewise Persian-origin given name Margaret.

The traditional short form of this name is Rita.

People

Given name 
Infanta Margarita, 2nd Duchess of Hernani (b. 1939), the younger sister of King Juan Carlos and aunt of the reigning King Felipe VI of Spain
Margaret of Austria (1584–1611), Queen consort of Spain and Portugal by her marriage to King Philip III and II
Margarita "Peggy" Schuyler Van Rensselaer (1758–1801), the third daughter of Continental Army General Philip Schuyler and sister in law of Alexander Hamilton
Princess Margarita, Countess of Colorno (born 1972), Dutch princess
Princess Margarita of Greece and Denmark (1905–1981), Greek princess consort
Margarita Teresa of Spain, Holy Roman Empress
Princess Margarita of Romania (born 1949), Romanian princess and Custodian of the Crown of Romania
Margarita Cedeño de Fernández, Dominican politician and lawyer, current Vice President and former First Lady of the Dominican Republic
Margarita Aliger (1915–1992), Soviet poet and journalist
Margarita Argúas (1902–1986), Argentine academic and judge
Lady Margarita Armstrong-Jones (born 2002), daughter of David Armstrong-Jones, 2nd Earl of Snowdon
 Margarita Carmen Cansino, the birth name of American actress Rita Hayworth
Margarita D'Amico (1938–2017), Venezuelan journalist, researcher, and professor
 Margarita María Birriel Salcedo (born 1953), Spanish-Puerto Rican professor, expert in women's history and women's studies
Nitza Margarita Cintrón (born 1969), Chief of Space Medicine at NASA's Johnson Space Center
Margarita Diez-Colunje y Pombo (1838-1919), Colombian historian, translator, genealogist
 Margarita Mariscal de Gante (born 1954), Spanish judge and politician
Margarita Gómez-Acebo y Cejuela (born 1935), the consort of Tsar Simeon II of Bulgaria
Margarita Henríquez, Panamese TV personality
Margarita Karapanou, Greek novelist 
Margarita Kolosov (born 2004), German rhythmic gymnast 
 Margarita Volkovinskaya, the birth name of Uzbekistani-American actress Rita Volk
Margarita Levieva, Russian-American actress
Margarita López, New York City politician
Margarita Beatriz Luna, Associate Justice of the Supreme Court of Mexico
Margarita Miniati, Greek scholar and writer
Margarita Moran-Floirendo (born 1953), Miss Universe 1973 from the Philippines
Margarita Mamun, Russian rhythmic gymnast
Margarita Michailidou, Greek taekwondo practitioner
Margarita Mukasheva, Kazakhstani runner
Margarita Nazarova (disambiguation), several people
Margarita Osmeña (born 1949), Filipino politician
Margarita Pasos, Colombian television presenter
Margarita Peña (1937-2018), writer, educator
Margarita Plevritou, Greek water polo player
Margarita Ponomaryova (born 1963), Russian hurdler
Margarita Pracatan (1931–2020), Cuban singer
Margarita Rivière, Spanish journalist and writer
Margarita Saxe-Coburg-Gotha, Spanish aristocrat
Margarita Starkevičiūtė, Lithuanian politician
Margarita Xhepa (born 1932), Albanian stage and film actress
Margarita Xirgu, Spanish stage actress
Margarita Zavala, former First Lady of Mexico

Fictional characters
 Alexandra Margarita Russo, a.k.a. Alex Russo, a character from Wizards of Waverly Place, and her mother Theresa Magdalena Margarita Russo
 Margarita Nikolaevna, one of the protagonists in the novel The Master and Margarita by Russian writer Mikhail Bulgakov
 Margarete or Gretchen in Faust by Johann Wolfgang von Goethe
 Marguerite Gautier, protagonist in the 1848 novel and 1852 play La Dame aux Camélias by Alexandre Dumas. It was made a movie "Camille" (1936) by George Cukor.
Detective Margarita "Maggie" Sawyer, a character portrayed by Floriana Lima on Supergirl (TV series).

See also
Margarita (disambiguation)

References

Feminine given names
Albanian feminine given names
Bulgarian feminine given names
Given names derived from gemstones
Greek feminine given names
Russian feminine given names
Spanish feminine given names